C'est Chic is the second studio album by American R&B band Chic, released on Atlantic Records in 1978.

Release 

C'est Chic includes the band's signature hit "Le Freak", which topped the US Hot 100 chart, US R&B, and US Club Play in October 1978, selling six million copies in the US. The album also contains the hit single "I Want Your Love" (number 5 R&B, number 7 Pop, number 4 UK).

C'est Chic was the band's most commercially successful album, reaching number 4 on Billboard's album chart and topping the US R&B chart for eleven weeks. C'est Chic was Billboards 1979 R&B Album of the Year, claiming the number one spot on Billboards Year End Review. The album was certified platinum by the RIAA, selling over a million copies. In the UK it peaked at number 2 and has been certified Gold by the BPI.

The European version was originally called Très Chic, with the cover featuring a woman wrapped around a neon light tube. It was withdrawn and replaced with the C'est Chic version with a less risqué cover. Très Chic had a different track listing.

C'est Chic was released on compact disc by Atlantic Records/Warner Music in 1991 (catalogue number 7567-81552-2). The album has been digitally remastered and re-issued twice: first in 2011 by Warner Music Japan and then in 2018 at Abbey Road Studios by Atlantic.

Track listing
All songs written by Bernard Edwards and Nile Rodgers; except where indicated.

C'est Chic
Side one
 "Chic Cheer" – 4:42
 "Le Freak" – 5:27 
 "Savoir Faire" – 5:01
 "Happy Man" – 4:17
Side two
 "I Want Your Love" – 6:55 
 "At Last I Am Free" – 7:08
 "Sometimes You Win" – 4:26
 "(Funny) Bone" – 3:41
(LP only hidden track- moog solo)

Très Chic
Side one
 "Chic Cheer" – 4:42
 "Le Freak" – 5:23 
 "I Want Your Love" – 6:55 
 "Happy Man" – 4:17
 "Dance, Dance, Dance (Yowsah, Yowsah, Yowsah)" (Edwards, Kenny Lehman, Rodgers) – 3:35
Side two
 "Savoir Faire" – 5:01
 "At Last I Am Free" – 7:08
 "Sometimes You Win" – 4:26
 "(Funny) Bone" – 3:41
 "Everybody Dance" - 3:22

Personnel

Musicians
 Alfa Anderson – lead vocals (A2, B1, B2, B3)
 Diva Gray  – lead vocals (A2)
 David Lasley – vocals
 Luci Martin – vocals
 Luther Vandross – vocals
 Robin Clark – backing vocals on "Dance, Dance, Dance" and "Everybody Dance" 
 Nile Rodgers – guitar, vocals
 Raymond Jones – Fender Rhodes electric piano
 Robert Sabino – clavinet, acoustic piano, electric piano
 Andy Schwartz – clavinet, acoustic piano, electric piano on "At Last I Am Free"
 Bernard Edwards – bass guitar; lead vocals (A4, B3)
 Tony Thompson – drums
 Sammy Figueroa – percussion
 Jon Faddis – trumpet
 Ellen Seeling – trumpet
 Alex Foster – saxophone
 Jean Fineberg – saxophone
 Barry Rogers – trombone
 Jose Rossy – tubular bells
 The Chic Strings:
 Marianne Carroll – strings
 Cheryl Hong – strings
 Karen Milne – strings
 Gene Orloff – concert master

Production
 Bernard Edwards – producer for Chic Organization Ltd.
 Nile Rodgers – producer for Chic Organization Ltd.
 Marc Kreiner, Tom Cossie – associate producers
 Bob Clearmountain – sound engineer
 Burt Szerlip – engineer
 Jeff Hendrickson – assistant engineer
 Ray Willard as "Positively No Way Ray (Willard?)" – assistant engineer
 Bob Defrin – art direction
 Joel Brodsky – photography
 All songs recorded and mixed at Power Station in New York. Mastered at Atlantic Studios, N.Y.

Charts

Weekly charts

Year-end charts

Certifications and sales

Cover Versions 
Robert Wyatt had a top 20 UK Indie Chart hit with a cover of "At Last I Am Free" in 1980.

See also
 List of number-one R&B albums of 1978 (U.S.)
 List of number-one R&B albums of 1979 (U.S.)
 Billboard Year-End

References

Chic (band) albums
1978 albums
Atlantic Records albums
Albums produced by Nile Rodgers
Albums produced by Bernard Edwards
Albums with cover art by Joel Brodsky